Diangobo may refer to:
Diangobo, Comoé, Ivory Coast
Diangobo, Lagunes, Ivory Coast
Diangokro, Lacs District, Ivory Coast, which is also referred to as Diangobo